Luis Alberto Escobedo (born September 3, 1962, in Santiago del Estero, Argentina) is a former Argentine footballer who played for clubs of Argentina and Chile.

Teams
  Los Andes 1982
  Belgrano de Córdoba 1983–1985
  Los Andes 1986–1987
  Colón de Santa Fe 1988–1989
  Santiago Wanderers 1990–1991
  Vélez Sársfield 1992–1993
  Belgrano de Córdoba 1994–1995
  Temperley 1996–1999
  Sportivo Dock Sud 1999–2000

External links
 

1962 births
Living people
Argentine footballers
Argentine expatriate footballers
Club Atlético Belgrano footballers
Club Atlético Los Andes footballers
Club Atlético Colón footballers
Club Atlético Vélez Sarsfield footballers
Santiago Wanderers footballers
Chilean Primera División players
Argentine Primera División players
Expatriate footballers in Chile
Association footballers not categorized by position
People from Santiago del Estero
Sportspeople from Santiago del Estero Province